Re Atlantic Computer Systems plc (No 1) [1990] EWCA Civ 20 is a UK insolvency law case concerning the administration procedure when a company is unable to repay its debts.

Facts
Atlantic Computer Systems plc, recently taken over by British and Commonwealth Holdings, had hired a set of computers. It went into insolvency. The company lending the computers attempted to repossess them. The administrators argued this was impermissible.

Judgment
The Court of Appeal held that the computers could not be repossessed directly. The landlords and hire purchase sellers could not get money as an expense of administrative receivership either, because ‘the lessor or owner of goods has his remedies.’ Nicholls LJ gave guidance on exercising security rights against companies in administration. Referring to the old s 11, he said the following.

See also

UK insolvency law
Soden v British and Commonwealth Holdings plc [1998] AC 298, misrepresentation claims of shareholders were not the same as claims by shareholders, and so not subordinated to the claims of other creditors.

Notes

References
L Sealy and S Worthington, Cases and Materials in Company Law (9th edn OUP 2010)
R Goode, Principles of Corporate Insolvency Law (4th edn Sweet & Maxwell 2011)

United Kingdom insolvency case law
1990 in case law
1990 in British law
Court of Appeal (England and Wales) cases